Sanchita Shetty is an Indian actress, who has appeared predominately in Tamil and Kannada films. She appeared in supporting roles at the beginning of her career. She got her first breakthrough after starring in female lead role in Soodhu Kavvum (2013).

Film career

Early Career (2006-2012)
She made her first film appearance in the Kannada hit film Mungaru Male (2006) as a friend to the film's female lead (Pooja Gandhi). In the next, she appeared in supporting roles in three Kannada films such as Milana (2007), Uda (2009) and Bhaya.com (2009). She also appeared in a film titled Gaganachukki, which never released. She left the Kannada industry to work in Tamil and she was not willing to do anymore second lead roles. She acted for her first Tamil film  Azhukkan Azhagakiran (2010). She is best known for featuring alongside Jayam Ravi in Thillalangadi (2010), with the director of the film Mohan Raja recommending her to also star in  Orange (2010) featuring Ram Charan. In 2012, she signed her first leading role in Kollaikaran.

Recognition and success (2013-2021)

She played an imaginary character in the film, which was received well. Sify wrote, "Sanchita Shetty as his (Vijay Sethupathy) girlfriend is smashing and delivers some one-liners with perfect lip sync". The film went on to be remade in several other Indian languages and Shetty expressed interest in reprising the role in its remakes as well. Then, she is paired with Ashok Selvan in Pizza II: Villa (2013).
 
In 2016, she signed a Kannada film after five years, Badmaash directed by Akash Srivatsa, which will see her playing a Radio Jockey. In Tamil, she continued to perform simultaneously as Ennodu Vilayadu (2017), Rum (2017), Enkitta Mothathe (2017), Yenda Thalaiyila Yenna Vekkala (2018) and Johnny (2018). In 2021, she appeared in Devadas Brothers and Vinodhaya Sitham.

Filmography

References

External links 
 

Actresses in Kannada cinema
Actresses from Mangalore
Actresses in Tamil cinema
Actresses in Telugu cinema
Living people
Indian film actresses
21st-century Indian actresses
1989 births